The 2001–02 Maltese First Division (known as the Rothmans First Division for sponsorship reasons) started on 15 September 2001 and finished on 28 April 2002. Rabat Ajax and Xgħajra Tornados were relegated from the Maltese Premier League. Mqabba and Balzan Youths were promoted from Maltese Second Division. Marsaxlokk were the champions while Mosta were the runners-up. Both teams were promoted to Maltese Premier League. Qormi and St. Andrews were relegated to Maltese Second Division.

Participating teams

The Maltese First Division 2001–02 was made up of these teams:
 Balzan Youths
 Gozo
 Marsaxlokk
 Mosta
 Mqabba
 Qormi
 Rabat Ajax
 St. Andrews
 St. Patrick
 Xgħajra Tornados

Changes from previous season

 Marsa and Lija Athletic were promoted from the First Division to the Premier League. They were replaced with Rabat Ajax and Xgħajra Tornados, both relegated from 2000–01 Maltese Premier League.
 Tarxien Rainbows and Żurrieq were relegated to the 2001–02 Maltese Second Division. They were replaced with Mqabba, champions of 2000–01 Second Division and Balzan Youths, runners-up.

Final league table

Results
For a complete set of results, see

Top scorers

References

Maltese First Division seasons
Malta
2

lt:Maltos pirmoji futbolo lyga